For the commune in France, see Chancia.

Chancia  is an extinct genus of Cambrian trilobite. It was a "fast-moving epifaunal detritivore" from Canada (British Columbia, specifically Burgess Shale, and Newfoundland) and the United States (Idaho, Pennsylvania, Utah, and Vermont). Chancia was a particle feeder. Its major characteristics are a normal glabella but an enlarged cephalon due to a pre-glabellar field in front of the glabella, as well as developed eye ridges, medium-sized genal spines, and an extremely small pygidium.

References

External links
 "Chancia palliseri". Burgess Shale Fossil Gallery. Virtual Museum of Canada. 2011. (Burgess Shale species 4)

Ptychopariida genera
Alokistocaridae
Cambrian trilobites
Burgess Shale animals
Burgess Shale fossils
Cambrian genus extinctions